Stathmopoda distincta is a moth of the family Stathmopodidae. It was described by Edward Meyrick in 1926. It is endemic to New Zealand.

References

Moths described in 1926
Stathmopodidae
Taxa named by Edward Meyrick
Moths of New Zealand
Endemic fauna of New Zealand
Endemic moths of New Zealand